City Chic Collective (CCC), founded as Miller's Retail in 1992, and rebranded  in December 2006 to Specialty Fashion Group, is an Australian retail clothing company. It is headquartered in the Sydney suburb of Alexandria.

Miller's Retail

Miller's Retail Ltd. was an Australian company that distributed women's apparel and accessories and was one of the country's largest retailers. It was founded by Gary Perlstein and Ian Miller in 1992. It was listed on the Australian Stock Exchange and had a market capitalisation of $360 million as at March, 2006.

It grew in part through acquisitions, including the Katies womenswear chain from Coles Myer (1999), and Crazy Clark's and Go-Lo stores in 2000.

Its sales for the year ending 30 June 2005 were $1.12 billion, with a net loss after tax of $103.4 million. This substantial loss was an unusual event for Miller's Retail and reflected considerable financial restructuring, including the revaluation of its businesses in Discount Variety. At the same time, the company told the market it had excessive inventory levels and pledged to address that, as well as to review buying practices in the future to avoid similar errors.

In its Apparel Division, Miller's Retail traded under the brands Miller's Fashion Club, Katies, Crossroads and 1626, which all sell women's clothing, with a total of over 700 stores. In November, 2005, it sold its Discount Variety Division, which owned Go-Lo, Crazy Clark's, Look Sharp Concepts and Chickenfeed, which had a total of 335 stores at the time of the sale. Miller's Retail sold its interest in the discount variety businesses after a price war with competitors had a major impact on the profits of the division. Private equity investor Catalyst Investment Manager and CHAMP acquired the group, the new entity being called Australian Discount Retail.

The company was listed on the Australian Stock Exchange in 1998. Its founder, Ian Miller, left the Managing Director's position in 2003, although continued for a time as Managing Director of Apparel Division and remained an executive director of the company. In December 2006 it was renamed to Specialty Fashion Group.

Miller's Fashion Club
Millers Retail's core business was the Miller's Fashion Club, a club or loyalty program, which had more than 2.8 million members across Australia and New Zealand.

Specialty Fashion Group
In July 2018, the company sold five of its brands; Autograph, Crossroads, Katies, Millers and Rivers, to Noni B (later renamed to Mosaic Brands) leaving only one brand, City Chic, in its portfolio. The remaining operations were rebranded City Chic Collective in November 2018.

In October 2019, CCC purchased the e-commerce assets of Avenue Stores from its administrator.

References

External links
Miller's Retail profile on Linkedin

Companies listed on the Australian Securities Exchange
Clothing retailers of Australia
Companies based in Sydney
Online retailers of Australia